Claire Stansfield is a British-Canadian actress, director, fashion designer and former model who is best known for her recurring role as Alti in several episodes of the TV series Xena: Warrior Princess and guest-starring roles on Cybill, Frasier, and The X-Files.

Life and career
Stansfield was born in London, England, to an English father and German mother. She was brought up for most of her youth in Toronto, Ontario, Canada, and despite having a British passport she considers herself a Canadian. As a teen she worked as a model in Canada and Britain before turning to acting. She studied at the Central School of Speech and Drama in London before moving to Hollywood, USA.

Besides her role as "Alti" in Xena: Warrior Princess, Stansfield's other roles include Sid in two episodes of the cult TV series Twin Peaks, one episode of Frasier as Kristina, and the eponymous "The Jersey Devil" in an episode of The X-Files. She also appeared in one episode of the 1990s TV series The Flash as the humanoid android A.L.P.H.A. and guest-starred in an episode of Cybill. In 1998, she starred opposite Dolph Lundgren in the Angolan set film, Sweepers. The film was shot and partly produced in South Africa.

Stansfield directed The Lovely Leave in 1999, based on the short story of the same name by Dorothy Parker.

Stansfield founded C&C California, a clothing line specialising in 1970s-style T-shirts, in partnership with Cheyann Benedict in 2002. C&C was acquired by Liz Claiborne in 2005.

Filmography

Film

Television

References

External links
 
 http://www.candccalifornia.com/

Businesspeople from London
Businesspeople from Toronto
English fashion designers
English film actresses
English television actresses
Living people
Film directors from London
Film directors from Toronto
Actresses from London
Actresses from Toronto
English people of German descent
20th-century English actresses
Alumni of the Royal Central School of Speech and Drama
Year of birth missing (living people)
British women fashion designers